Americana Deluxe is the second studio album by Big Bad Voodoo Daddy. This album is also sometimes called Big Bad Voodoo Daddy, as the album cover prominently displays a stylized "Big Bad Voodoo Daddy" logo and does not feature the phrase "Americana Deluxe" on it. However, the liner notes and the band's website clearly show that the title is Americana Deluxe.

Track listing

"You and Me and the Bottle Makes 3 Tonight (Baby)" incorporates a passage from the waltz "Sobre las Olas" by Juventino Rosas.

"Jumpin' Jack" includes a portion of "It Don't Mean a Thing (If It Ain't Got That Swing)" by Duke Ellington and Irving Mills.

Personnel
Jeff Harris  – trombone
Karl Hunter  – clarinet, Alto/Tenor/Baritone saxophone
Joshua Levy  – piano, vocals
Glen "The Kid" Markevka  – trumpet, vocals
Scotty Morris  – guitar, vocals, producer, package concept
Andy "Lucious" Rowley  – tenor/baritone saxophone, vocals, baritone, art direction, design
Dirk Shumaker  – bass, vocals, double bass
Kurt Sodergren  – Percussion, drums, gong

References

1998 albums
Big Bad Voodoo Daddy albums
Interscope Records albums